Malzi is a former municipality in Kukës County, Albania. At the 2015 local government reform it became a subdivision of the municipality Kukës. The population at the 2011 census was 3,072. The municipal unit consists of the following villages:

 Shëmri
 Shtanë
 Petkaj
 Megullë
 Camë
 Gdheshtë
 Pistë 
 Va Spas
 Shikaj
 Dukagjin
 Kalimash
 Kryemadh
 Simon

Etymology

The name of the region dates back to 1444 and is mentioned numerous times during the centuries. The most acceptable theory is that the region was named Malzi (English = Black Mountain) because of the Black Pined mountain forests of the region.

References

Former municipalities in Kukës County
Administrative units of Kukës